MKP or mkp may refer to:

Codes 
 mkp, the ISO 639-3 language code for Moikodi, spoken by small groups in the southeastern peninsula of New Guinea

Organizations 
 The ManKind Project, a non-profit international educational organization
 Miles Kelly Publishing, an independent children's publishing company based in Essex, UK

Political parties 
 Party of the Hungarian Coalition, a political party in Slovakia, for the Magyar (i.e. ethnic Hungarian) minority
 Hungarian Communist Party, a former Hungarian political party
 Maoist Communist Party, a clandestine communist organization in Turkey
 Maurin Kiribati Pati, a political party in Kiribati
 Mazdoor Kisan Party, a communist party in Pakistan

Science and technology 
 MAP kinase phosphatase (with MAP standing for mitogen-activated protein), an enzyme (see also: MAP kinase)
 Metallized plastic polypropylene, a type of plastic-film capacitor
 Monobasic potassium phosphate, another name for monopotassium phosphate (KH2PO4). The K comes from Latin kalium, which means potassium.
 Multidimensional knapsack problem, a problem in combinatorial optimization
 Kilopondmetre, a unit of torque

People
MKP is used to refer to Starcraft 2 progamer MarineKing, formerly known as MarineKingPrime